Victor Manuel Chavez CBE (born 19 January 1963) is the Chief Executive of Thales UK, a main electronics and defence company in the UK. Thales UK employs around 7,500 people.

Early life
Born in Barrow-in-Furness, Chavez was educated at Barrow Grammar School for Boys, after which he gained a degree in Physics from the University of York in 1984. From the University of Surrey he gained an MSc in Satellite Engineering & Telecommunications in 1993.

Career

Thales
He joined the company in 1999.
He became Chief Executive of Thales UK (Thales Holdings UK) on 1 January 2011. He had been Deputy Chief Executive for three years previously. Thales UK is involved in sonar, radar, and avionics. It makes most of the UK's aircraft simulators in Crawley in West Sussex. Thales Air Defence in Belfast makes helicopter-launched missiles. Thales has 67,000 employees in 56 countries.

He is a board member of techUK (trade association) and EngineeringUK (previously the Engineering and Technology Board). He is a co-chairman of the Information Economy Council.

Personal life
He was appointed a CBE in the 2015 New Year Honours. He grew up in Barrow-in-Furness, and now lives in Hampshire. He married in September 1992 in Cumbria, and has two daughters, born June 1994 and May 1997.

See also
 Ian King, Chief Executive of BAE Systems since September 2008
 UK cyber security community
 Centre national de la recherche scientifique

References

External links
 Thales UK Board of Directors
 UK skills presentation in April 2015

1963 births
Aerospace industry in the United Kingdom
Alumni of the University of Surrey
Alumni of the University of York
British businesspeople in the armaments industry
Businesspeople in aviation
Commanders of the Order of the British Empire
People from Hart District
Thales Group people
Living people
People from Barrow-in-Furness
People educated at Barrow-in-Furness Grammar School for Boys